Miss Universe 1968, the 17th Miss Universe pageant, was held on 13 July 1968 at the Miami Beach Auditorium in Miami Beach, Florida, United States. Martha Vasconcellos of Brazil was crowned by Sylvia Hitchcock of the United States at the end of the event.

Results

Placements

Special Awards

Contestants

  - María del Carmen Jordán Vidal
  - Sandra Croes
  - Laureen Jones
  - Brigitte Kruger
  - Brenda Fountain
  - Sonja Doumen
  - Victoria Martin
  - Roxana Bowles Chávez
  - Ilse Maria De Jong
  - Martha Maria Cordeiro Vasconcelos
  - Nancy Wilson
  - Sheila Jayatilleke
  - Dánae Monserrat Salas Sarradell
  - Luz Elena Restrepo González
  - Elizabeth Tavares
  - Ana María Rivera
  - Anne Marie Braafheid
  - Gitte Broge
  - Ana María Ortiz 
  - Priscila Álava González
  - Jennifer Lowe Summers
  - Leena Marketta Brusiin†
  - Elizabeth Cadren
  - Lilian Atterer
 - Miranta Zafiropoulou
  - Arlene Vilma Chaco
  - Claudie Paquin
  - Nathalie Heyl
  - Nora Idalia Guillén
  - Tammy Yung
  - Helen Knuttsdóttir
  - Anjum Mumtaz Barg
  - Tiffany Scales
  - Miriam Friedman
  - Cristina Businari
  - Marjorie Bromfield
  - Yasuyo Lino †
  - Kim Yoon-jung
  - Sonia Fares
  - Lucienne Krier
  - Maznah Binte Mohammed Ali
  - Kathlene Farrugia
  - Perla Olivia Aguirre Muñoz
  - Christine Mary Antunovic
  - Margine Davidson Morales
  - Tone Knaran
 Okinawa - Sachie Kawamitsu
  - María Esther Brambilla
  - Rosario "Charina" Rosello Zaragoza
  - Marylene Carrasquillo
  - Helen Davidson
  - Yasmin Saif
  - Monica Fairall †
  - Yolanda Legarreta Urquijo
  - Anne-Marie Hellqvist
  - Jeannette Biffiger
  - Apantree Prayutsenee
  - Rekaia Dekhil
  - Zuhal Aktan
  - Graciela Minarrieta
  - Dorothy Catherine Anstett
  - Peggy Kopp Arenas
  - Sadie Sargeant
  - Judith Radford
  - Daliborka Stojsic

Notes

Withdrawals
 
 
  – Maria Eugenia Torres

General References

References

1968
1968 in Florida
1968 beauty pageants
Beauty pageants in the United States
Events in Miami Beach, Florida
July 1968 events in the United States